Longfield Academy may refer to:

Longfield Academy, Darlington, a secondary school in Darlington, County Durham, England
Longfield Academy, Kent, a secondary school in Longfield, Kent, England

See also
Long Field Academy